Soutu los Infantes is one of 28 parishes (administrative divisions) in Salas, a municipality within the province and autonomous community of Asturias, in northern Spain.

Villages and hamlets
 Arbodas 
 La Escosura
 La Veiga
 Lleirosu
 Silvouta
 Soutu

References

Parishes in Salas